The Marin Independent Journal is the main newspaper of Marin County, California. The paper is owned by California Newspapers Partnership, which is in turn mostly owned by MediaNews Group.

History
The Independent Journal was formed from the merger of the Marin Journal and the San Rafael Daily Independent in 1948.  The weekly Journal, one of the state's oldest newspapers, had been established in 1861 as the Marin County Journal.  The Journal was published in San Rafael on Saturdays by Jerome A. Barney. The Independent had been started by Harry Granice in 1900 as the weekly San Rafael Independent, which became a daily by 1903 under the management of his daughter, Celeste Granice Murphy. The merged paper was originally called the San Rafael Independent-Journal.

Gannett acquired the paper from the Brown family in 1980. MediaNews Group acquired the paper from Gannett in 2000. Gannett turned over the newspaper to a partnership headed by Dean Singleton and it is now owned and operated by a company made up of investment bankers.

The "hot-tubber" incident
In 2002, former President George H. W. Bush described "American Taliban" John Walker Lindh as "some misguided Marin County hot-tubber." His comment prompted criticism among readers of the Marin Independent Journal, until Bush sent the paper a letter of apology:Call off the dogs, please. I surrender...I apologize. I am chastened and will never use 'hot tub' and 'Marin county' in the same sentence again.

Staff 
The publisher and president of the Marin Independent Journal is Rob Devincenzi. Previous to this position, Devincenzi was named editor and publisher of several South Bay weekly newspapers.

Awards
The Independent Journal won two first-place awards, three second-place awards and six "honorable mention" awards in the annual California News Publishers Association Better Newspapers Contest for 2016.

In 2020, the annual California News Publishers Association contest awarded 11 awards to The Independent Journal with a second-place award for general excellence.

Of these awards, The Independent Journal won second place in the breaking news category for a report of a mudslide in Sausalito in 2019. It won a third-place award for an editorial by Brad Breithaupt and a news photo by Alan Dep. Dep was also awarded a fourth-place award for feature photography alongside George Russel for editorial illustration

Notes

External links

Official website

Newspapers established in 1861
Mass media in Marin County, California
Daily newspapers published in the San Francisco Bay Area
1861 establishments in California